This is a list of media associated with the anime and manga series Grenadier.

Volume list

Anime episode list

DVDs

Soundtrack Information

References 

Grenadier - The Senshi of Smiles media
Grenadier - The Senshi of Smiles